Patrice Lajoye (born 26 July 1974) is a French religious studies scholar and comparative mythologist who specializes on the study of Celtic and Slavic paganism. The co-founder of the journal Nouvelle Mythologie comparée, he currently works for the CNRS at the Maison de la Recherche en Sciences Humaines of the University of Caen, and serves as the sub-editor of Histoire et Sociétés Rurales. Lajoye has also written studies on Russian fantasy and science-fiction literature, as well as translations, anthologies, and novels.

Career 
Born on 26 July 1974 in Lisieux, Normandie, Patrice Lajoye first worked as a volunteer on archaeological sites in northwestern France in the 1990s. He earned a Master in geography from the University of Caen in 1998, then a PhD in comparative mythology summa cum laude from the Faculté ouverte des Religions et Humanismes laïques de Charleroi (Belgium) in 2008, under the direction of Celtic scholar . He was the director of the journal Mythologie Française from 2003 to 2007. He also served as the sub-editor of the journal . Lajoye is a member of the Société historique de Lisieux.

His 2017 work Étoiles rouges: la littérature de science-fiction soviétique, co-written with his wife Viktoriya Lajoye, was awarded the Grand prix de l'Imaginaire for the best essay in 2018.

Works 

 (with Jirí Dynda and Alexander Ivanenko)

References

1974 births
Comparative mythologists
Celtic studies scholars
Slavists
Université catholique de Louvain alumni
Living people